Poa arachnifera, the Texas bluegrass, is a species of grass. It is a dioecious perennial plant, native to the southern Great Plains of the United States.

Hybridization with Kentucky bluegrass

During the 1990s, botanists began experimenting with producing hybrids of Texas bluegrass and Kentucky bluegrass (Poa pratensis) for use as wintering foraging plant for grazing livestock and as a drought-resistant lawn grass. The hybrids appear similar to Kentucky bluegrass, but maintain their green color in higher temperatures. Seed manufacturers began marketing the first of these hybrids, often termed "heat-tolerant bluegrasses", in the first decade of the 21st century.

References

External links
European Poa Database
Wildflower.org

arachnifera
Lawn grasses
Dioecious plants